Șoimuș is a commune in Hunedoara County, Transylvania, Romania. It is composed of ten villages: Bălata (Balátatelep), Bejan (Bezsán), Bejan-Târnăvița (Bezsántelep), Boholt (Boholt), Căinelu de Jos (Alsókajanel), Chișcădaga (Kecskedága), Fornădia (Fornádia), Păuliș (until 1960 Buruene; Burjánfalva), Sulighete (Szúliget) and Șoimuș.

Notes

External links
6000 year old settlement discovered at Șoimuș

Communes in Hunedoara County
Localities in Transylvania